Jiří Opavský (11 January 1931 – 23 October 2021) was a Czech cyclist. He competed in three events at the 1956 Summer Olympics.

References

External links
 

1931 births
2021 deaths
Czech male cyclists
Olympic cyclists of Czechoslovakia
Cyclists at the 1956 Summer Olympics
Sportspeople from Prague